Events in the year 1830 in Belgium.

Incumbents
Monarch: William I of the Netherlands (to 4 October)

Events

August
 25 August – Belgian Revolution begins

September
 24 September – Provisional Government of Belgium formed

October
 October – Garde Civique formed to maintain public order
 4 October – Provisional government proclaims Belgian independence.
 17 October – Decree of the provisional government prohibiting importation of jenever from the Netherlands.
 27 October – Belgian forces take Antwerp; Dutch forces bombard the city from Antwerp Citadel.

November
 3 November – Elections for the National Congress of Belgium held.
 10 November – First session of the National Congress of Belgium.
 25 November – Étienne-Modeste Glorieux founds the fraternity in Ronse that would eventually become the Brothers of Our Lady of Lourdes

December
 26 December – The five powers represented in the London Conference (Austria, Britain, France, Prussia, Russia) recognise Belgian independence.

Publications
 Almanach du commerce du royaume des Pays-Bas: Bruxelles et ses environs (Brussels, Grignon)
 Promenades dans Bruxelles et ses environs (Brussels, Berthot)
 Vade Mecum, ou description de Bruxelles et ses environs (Brussels, C. J. De Mat)

Births
 13 April – Ferdinand Pauwels, painter (died 1904)
 25 April – Julius de Geyter, writer (died 1905)
 1 May – Guido Gezelle, poet (died 1899)
 28 May – Prosper de Haulleville, newspaperman (died 1898)

Deaths
 26 February – Joseph Denis Odevaere (born 1775), painter
 4 November – Frédéric de Merode (born 1798), revolutionary
 17 November – Petrus Johannes van Regemorter (born 1755), painter
 27 November – André Parmentier (born 1780), landscape architect

References

 
Belgium
Years of the 19th century in Belgium
1830s in Belgium
Belgium